Barano d'Ischia is a comune (municipality) in the Metropolitan City of Naples  in the Italian region Campania, located in the south-west area of Ischia island, about 30 km southwest of Naples.

It is after Forio the largest comune in size of the island, although not one of the most populated. Its territory is composed by several small villages: Buonopane, Piedimonte, Fiaiano, Testaccio (no one of this small villages has become a frazione); Testaccio was formerly an independent municipality.

Barano d'Ischia borders the following municipalities: Casamicciola Terme, Ischia, Serrara Fontana.

History and main sights
The area was first settled by the Greeks, who had a nymphaeum here.

Main sights include:
The Pilastri aqueduct (1470)
Church of St. John the Baptist (15th century), one of the most ancient in the island. It houses a canvas by a Caravaggist.
Saracen Tower, in the village of Testaccio
Windmills in Montebarano

External links
 Official website

References 

Cities and towns in Campania
Ischia